Trapeze, also known as Trapeze 1975, is the fifth studio album by English hard rock band Trapeze. Recorded with producer Steve Smith at Island Studios, London, it was released in 1975 by Warner Bros. Records. The album was preceded by the release of one single, a cover version of "On the Sunny Side of the Street", originally recorded by Frank Sinatra.

Reception

Music website AllMusic awarded Trapeze two out of five stars. Writer Dave Thompson described the album as "a dour little disc, desperately missing the funk infusions of Glenn Hughes and, for the most part, overshadowed even by its disappointing predecessor". Thompson identified opening track "Star Breaker" as "probably the best" song on Trapeze, but summarised the release as "lumpen rock by rote, dull and dismissed by all but the most desperately faithful".

Track listing

Personnel

Musical personnel
Mel Galley – guitar, vocals
Rob Kendrick – guitar
Pete Wright – bass
Dave Holland – drums
Glenn Hughes – vocals on tracks 3 and 10

Additional personnel
Steve Smith – production
Phill Brown – engineering
Bobby Hata – mastering
Seabrook Graves Aslett – artwork

References

1975 albums
Trapeze (band) albums
Warner Records albums